Leelamine (dehydroabietylamine) is a diterpene amine that has weak affinity for the cannabinoid receptors CB1 and CB2, as well as being an inhibitor of pyruvate dehydrogenase kinase. Optically active leelamine is also used as a chiral resolving agent for carboxylic acids.  Leelamine has been shown to be effective against certain cancer cells, independent from its activity on CB receptors or PDK1 - it accumulates inside the acidic lysosomes leading to disruption of intracellular cholesterol transport, autophagy and endocytosis followed by cell death.

See also
 Abietic acid

References

External links
Simple Leaf CBD

Amines
Cannabinoids
Diterpene alkaloids
Isopropyl compounds
Phenanthrenes